Primera división (Spanish for First division) can refer to multiple top-division football leagues and other sports:


Football

CONMEBOL (South America) 
Argentine Primera División
Bolivian Primera División
Chilean Primera División
Paraguayan Primera División
Peruvian Primera División
Uruguayan Primera División
Venezuelan Primera División

CONCACAF (Central and North America) 
Costa Rican Primera División
Primera División de Fútbol de El Salvador
Liga MX or Primera División,  Mexico
Nicaraguan Primera División

UEFA (Europe) 
La Liga or Primera División, Spain
Primera Divisió, Andorra
Primera División (women)

See also 
Segunda División (disambiguation)
Primera (disambiguation)
Division 1 (disambiguation)